The 2018 WNBA season is the 20th season for the Connecticut Sun franchise of the WNBA. It is also the 16th season for the franchise in Connecticut. The season tipped off on May 13.

The Sun got off to a strong start, going 3–0 in May.  All three wins were at home.  In June, the Sun started strong, winning their first 4 of 5.  However, they lost 5 of their next 7 games to finish 6–6 on the month.  That skid included a 1–4 road trip, where all losses came 4 of eventual top 5 playoff teams.  Their up and down season continued into July, where the Sun were 5–6.  July started with another tough road trip where the Sun went 1–3.  From there the Sun couldn't get a streak going; losing 2 then winning 2 then losing 2 again.  The Sun surged in August posting a 7–1 record, including going 6–0 at home.  Their only loss came on the road to Chicago.  The Sun finished 21–13, which earned them the 4th seed in the 2018 WNBA Playoffs.  Their playoff run fell short when they lost at home in the second round 86–96.  This was the Sun's only playoff game, as they earned a first round bye.

Transactions

WNBA Draft

Trades/Roster Changes

Current roster

Game log

Preseason 

|- style="background:#bbffbb;"
| 1
| May 7
| Los Angeles
| W 68–65
| J. Thomas (12)
| Ogwumike (8)
| Tied (2)
| Mohegan Sun Arena
| 1–0
|- style="background:#bbffbb;"
| 2
| May 8
| Dallas
| W 79–58
| Williams (18)
| A. Thomas (12)
| A. Thomas (5)
| Mohegan Sun Arena3,695
| 2–0
|- style="background:#bbffbb;"
| 3
| May 11
| Atlanta
| W 74–58
| Bentley (13)
| 3 Tied (5)
| J. Thomas (3)
| Webster Bank Arena1,610
| 3–0

Regular season

|- style="background:#bfb;"
| 1
| May 20
| Las Vegas
| W 101–65
| Bentley (18)
| A. Thomas (17)
| J. Thomas (6)
| Mohegan Sun Arena6,637
| 1–0
|- style="background:#bfb;"
| 2
| May 24
| Los Angeles
| W 102–94
| Ogwumike (18)
| A. Thomas (9)
| J. Thomas (8)
| Mohegan Sun Arena5,571
| 2–0
|- style="background:#bfb;"
| 3
| May 26
| Indiana
| W 86–77
| A. Thomas (21)
| Ogwumike (8)
| Williams (6)
| Mohegan Sun Arena5,843
| 3–0

|- style="background:#bfb;"
| 4
| June 1
| @ Chicago
| W 110–72
| Tied (20)
| A. Thomas (13)
| J. Thomas (8)
| Wintrust Arena4,131
| 4–0
|- style="background:#bfb;"
| 5
| June 3
| @ Washington
| W 88–64
| J. Thomas (25)
| Williams (10)
| A. Thomas (4)
| Capital One Arena5,176
| 5–0
|- style="background:#fcc;"
| 6
| June 5
| @ Atlanta
| L 77–82
| A. Thomas (19)
| A. Thomas (17)
| A. Thomas (7)
| McCamish Pavilion2,830
| 5–1
|- style="background:#bfb;"
| 7
| June 7
| @ New York
| W 88–86
| J. Thomas (19)
| 3 Tied (9)
| J. Thomas (8)
| Westchester County Center1,581
| 6–1
|- style="background:#bfb;"
| 8
| June 9
| Minnesota
| W 89–75
| Williams (22)
| Tied (11)
| Tied (4)
| Mohegan Sun Arena6,771
| 7–1
|- style="background:#fcc;"
| 9
| June 13
| Washington
| L 91–95
| Williams (34)
| Ogwumike (13)
| J. Thomas (5)
| Mohegan Sun Arena
| 7–2
|- style="background:#fcc;"
| 10
| June 15
| @ Seattle
| L 92–103
| Ogwumike (30)
| J. Jones (8)
| J. Thomas (6)
| KeyArena7,094
| 7–3
|- style="background:#fcc;"
| 11
| June 16
| @ Phoenix
| L 72–89
| Tuck (20)
| Williams (6)
| Banham (4)
| Talking Stick Resort Arena12,497
| 7–4
|- style="background:#fcc;"
| 12
| June 22
| @ Atlanta
| L 70–75
| Bentley (18)
| J. Jones (7)
| Tied (4)
| McCamish Pavilion4,047
| 7–5
|- style="background:#bfb;"
| 13
| June 24
| @ Indiana
| W 87–78
| Banham (20)
| B. Jones (10)
| Bentley (6)
| Bankers Life Fieldhouse5,458
| 8–5
|- style="background:#fcc;"
| 14
| June 26
| @ Washington
| L 80–92
| Ogwumike (17)
| Ogwumike (11)
| Bentley (6)
| Capital One Arena4,139
| 8–6
|- style="background:#bfb;"
| 15
| June 27
| Indiana
| W 101–89
| Tied (21)
| Ogwumike (10)
| J. Thomas (6)
| Mohegan Sun Arena5,112
| 9–6

|- style="background:#fcc;"
| 16
| July 1
| @ Seattle
| L 70–84
| Bentley (15)
| 4 Tied (6)
| Bentley (4)
| KeyArena9,307
| 9–7
|- style="background:#bfb;"
| 17
| July 3
| @ Los Angeles
| W 73–72
| Ogwumike (21)
| Tied (7)
| Banham (6)
| Staples Center6,280
| 10–7
|- style="background:#fcc;"
| 18
| July 5
| @ Phoenix
| L 77–84
| 3 Tied (11)
| Tuck (8)
| 3 Tied (3)
| Talking Stick Resort Arena8,599
| 10–8
|- style="background:#fcc;"
| 19
| July 7
| @ Las Vegas
| L 90–94
| Tuck (20)
| Ogwumike (11)
| J. Thomas (8)
| Mandalay Bay Events Center3,363
| 10–9
|- style="background:#fcc;"
| 20
| July 11
| New York
| L 76–79
| Ogwumike (17)
| A. Thomas (10)
| Williams (5)
| Mohegan Sun Arena7,413
| 10–10
|- style="background:#bfb;"
| 21
| July 13
| Phoenix
| W 91–87
| Williams (25)
| Williams (10)
| A. Thomas (10)
| Mohegan Sun Arena7,696
| 11–10
|- style="background:#bfb;"
| 22
| July 15
| @ Minnesota
| W 83–64
| Tuck (15)
| Williams (8)
| Clarendon (5)
| Target Center9,234
| 12–10
|- style="background:#fcc;"
| 23
| July 17
| Atlanta
| L 83–86
| J. Jones (19)
| A. Thomas (10)
| J. Thomas (6)
| Mohegan Sun Arena5,555
| 12–11
|- style="background:#fcc;"
| 24
| July 20
| Seattle
| L 65–78
| Ogwumike (21)
| Ogwumike (12)
| Banham (5)
| Mohegan Sun Arena7,908
| 12–12
|- style="background:#bfb;"
| 25
| July 22
| @ Dallas
| W 92–75
| Stricklen (24)
| A. Thomas (8)
| J. Thomas (9)
| College Park Center4,935
| 13–12
|- style="background:#bfb;"
| 26
| July 24
| Washington
| W 94–68
| J. Jones (23)
| Williams (10)
| Williams (6)
| Mohegan Sun Arena5,125
| 14–12

|- style="background:#bfb;"
| 27
| August 1
| New York
| W 92–77
| J. Jones (21)
| A. Thomas (12)
| Williams (6)
| Mohegan Sun Arena6,412
| 15–12
|- style="background:#bfb;"
| 28
| August 5
| Las Vegas
| W 109–88
| J. Thomas (30)
| Tied (7)
| Williams (5)
| Mohegan Sun Arena6,791
| 16–12
|- style="background:#bfb;"
| 29
| August 8
| @ Dallas
| W 101–92
| A. Thomas (22)
| Williams (10)
| J. Thomas (9)
| College Park Center3,483
| 17–12
|- style="background:#fcc;"
| 30
| August 10
| @ Chicago
| L 86–97
| Ogwumike (18)
| Tied (6)
| Tied (3)
| Wintrust Arena5,976
| 17–13
|- style="background:#bfb;"
| 31
| August 12
| Chicago
| W 82–75
| Williams (22)
| J. Jones (15)
| J. Thomas (8)
| Mohegan Sun Arena7,687
| 18–13
|- style="background:#bfb;"
| 32
| August 14
| Dallas
| W 96–76
| J. Jones (27)
| J. Jones (10)
| J. Thomas (7)
| Mohegan Sun Arena6,365
| 19–13
|- style="background:#bfb;"
| 33
| August 17
| Minnesota
| W 96–79
| J. Jones (26)
| Tied (8)
| A. Thomas (8)
| Mohegan Sun Arena7,089
| 20–13
|- style="background:#bfb;"
| 34
| August 19
| Los Angeles
| W 89–86
| J. Thomas (27)
| J. Jones (9)
| J. Jones (7)
| Mohegan Sun Arena8,040
| 21–13

Playoffs

|- style="background:#fcc;"
| 1
| August 23
| Phoenix
| L 86–96
| Williams (27)
| Williams (8)
| J. Jones (7)
| Mohegan Sun Arena7,858
| 0–1

Standings

Playoffs

Awards and honors

Statistics

Regular season

References

External links
The Official Site of the Connecticut Sun

Connecticut Sun seasons
Connecticut Sun
Events in Uncasville, Connecticut